Very Proud of Ya is the second studio album by American rock band AFI. It was released on June 18, 1996, through Nitro Records.

Background
The liner notes of the album state that all the tracks are copyrighted to Anthems for Insubordinates, while the mailing address states the band's name as Asking for It. It is the last album to feature bassist Geoff Kresge, who illustrated the album cover as well. The album features future band member Jade Puget performing back-up vocals. It was recorded in about a week.

The tracks "Two of a Kind" and "Yürf Rendenmein" were re-recorded from their debut album Answer That and Stay Fashionable. The title of "Love is a Many Splendored Thing" is a reference to the song of the same name by Sammy Fain and Paul Francis Webster, although it is not a cover.

A music video, the band's first, was made for "He Who Laughs Last..." Directed by Darren Doane and Ken Daurio, it draws inspiration from the film Goodfellas (1990).

The songs "Cruise Control" and "Love Is a Many Splendored Thing" were used in the 1996 independent film Mary Jane's Not a Virgin Anymore, which was first screened in 1997 and also features Havok in a small role.

Track listing

Personnel
Credits adapted from liner notes.

 AFI – producer
 Tom Audisio – band photo
 Adam Carson – drums, percussion, backing vocals
 Davey Havok –– lead vocals, additional guitar (track 18)
 Geoff Kresge – bass, vocals, cover drawing
 Paul Marchand – additional guitar (pregap track)
 Mark Stopholese– lead guitar, backing vocals
 Rockabilly Nick 13 – rhythm guitar, vocals
 Dayton Paiva – live shots
 BJ Papas – live shots
 Jade "The Playah" Puget – additional guitars, vocals
 Michael Rosen – producer, engineer
 Eddie Shreyer – mastering
 Winni Wintermeyer – design

Studios
 Recorded at T.M.L. Studios, Hayward, CA
 Mastered  at Future Disc

References

AFI (band) albums
1996 albums
Nitro Records albums